Lewis J. Martin (February 22, 1844 – May 5, 1913) was an American lawyer and Democratic Party politician who briefly represented New Jersey's 6th congressional district in the United States House of Representatives in 1913.

Early life and career
Martin was born near Deckertown (now Sussex, New Jersey) on February 22, 1844. He attended the common schools. He studied law, was admitted to the bar in 1867 and commenced practice in Branchville, New Jersey.

He was chief clerk in the office of the county clerk of Sussex County in 1868 and 1869, and was county clerk of Sussex County in 1869. Martin was a member of the New Jersey General Assembly from 1879 to 1881. He was a judge of the Sussex County Court from 1881 to 1896. Martin served as attorney to the Board of Chosen Freeholders of Sussex County from 1896 to 1911, when he was appointed county judge by Governor of New Jersey Woodrow Wilson and served until his death. He was a member of the town committee from 1896 to 1907, and was a member of the New Jersey Senate from 1898 to 1903.

U.S. House of Representatives
He was elected as a Democrat to the Sixty-third Congress and served from March 4, 1913, until his death in Washington, D.C. on May 5, 1913. He was interred in Newton Cemetery in Newton, New Jersey.

See also
List of United States Congress members who died in office (1900–49)

References

External links

Lewis J. Martin at The Political Graveyard

Lewis J. Martin, late a representative from New Jersey, Memorial addresses delivered in the House of Representatives and Senate frontispiece 1915

1844 births
1913 deaths
Democratic Party New Jersey state senators
People from Sussex, New Jersey
Politicians from Sussex County, New Jersey
Democratic Party members of the United States House of Representatives from New Jersey
Burials in New Jersey
19th-century American politicians